The third season of the Black Clover anime TV series was directed by Tatsuya Yoshihara and produced by Pierrot. The season premiered on October 1, 2019 on TV Tokyo in Japan. The season adapts Yūki Tabata's manga series of the same name from the rest of the 17th volume to the end of the 23rd volume (chapters 160–228), with the exception of episodes 123 and 124 (recap), and episodes 130–154, which are officially considered anime canon episodes that were supervised by Tabata. On April 26, 2020, it was announced that after Episode 132, the remaining episodes of the season would be delayed due to the effects of the COVID-19 pandemic. After a two-month hiatus, the season resumed on July 7, 2020. Both Crunchyroll and Funimation licensed the series for an English release, with Crunchyroll simulcasting the third season, and Funimation producing a North American Simuldub. Funimation's adaptation premiered on February 2, 2020 on Adult Swim's Toonami programming block. Toonami's broadcast went on hiatus after episode 136 on October 25, 2020 as a result of production delays for the English dub caused by the COVID-19 pandemic. The season resumed its run on Toonami on February 14, 2021 and ended on June 13.

The third season uses eight pieces of theme music: four opening themes and four ending themes. The second opening and ending themes, used for episodes 116 to 128, are "Black Catcher" by Vickeblanka and "New Page" by Intersection. The third opening and ending themes, used for episodes 129 to 140, are "Stories" by Snow Man and "Answer" by Kaf.


Episode list

Home media release

Japanese
In Japan, Avex Pictures released the season of the anime on DVD and Blu-ray in five "chapter" volumes, with the eleventh volume released on April 24, 2020, and the fifteenth volume released on February 26, 2021.

English
In North America, Crunchyroll & Funimation released the season on DVD and Blu-ray combination sets. The first volume was released on October 27, 2020. The now-combined company also distributes the series in the United Kingdom and Ireland via Crunchyroll UK and Ireland, and in Australia and New Zealand via Madman Entertainment.

Notes

References

Black Clover episode lists
2019 Japanese television seasons
2020 Japanese television seasons
Anime postponed due to the COVID-19 pandemic
Anime productions suspended due to the COVID-19 pandemic